Zaleops is a monotypic moth genus in the family Erebidae erected by George Hampson in 1926. Its only species, Zaleops umbrina, was first described by Augustus Radcliffe Grote in 1883. It is found in the US state of Arizona.

The MONA or Hodges number for Zaleops umbrina is 8677.

References

Further reading

 
 
 

Omopterini
Articles created by Qbugbot
Moths described in 1883
Monotypic moth genera